The 2013 Pac-12 Football Championship Game was played on Saturday, December 7, 2013 at Sun Devil Stadium in Tempe, Arizona, to determine the champion of the Pac-12 Conference in football for the 2013 season. North Division champion Stanford defeated South Division champion Arizona State to win their second consecutive Pac-12 title. The ESPN television networks broadcast the game, beginning at 4:45 PM PT/5:45 PM MT. Stanford went on to represent the Pac-12 Conference in the 2014 Rose Bowl Game.

History
The game was the third edition of the Pac-12 Football Championship Game. The previous season, the Stanford Cardinal defeated the UCLA Bruins 27–24 to win the conference title and represent the Pac-12 in the 2013 Rose Bowl Game.

Teams

Stanford

For the fourth season in a row, the Cardinal won 10 or more games. Led by LB Trent Murphy and LB Shayne Skov, the defense entered the game allowing just 87.3 yards rushing (3rd in FBS) and averaging 2.92 sacks (tied for 11th in FBS). Offensively, Stanford was led by RB Tyler Gaffney, who gained 1,485 yards this season for 17 touchdowns; and WR Ty Montgomery, who gained 161.9 all-purpose yards per game and scored 12 touchdowns.

Arizona State

Arizona State made its debut Pac-12 Championship game, having achieved its first 10-win season since 2007. During the regular season, the team outscored its opponents by 84 points and posted a 7-0 record when playing at home in Sun Devil Stadium.

Scoring summary

1st quarter scoring: STAN – Tyler Gaffney 69-yard run (Jordan Williamson kick); 
ASU – D. J. Foster 51-yard run (Zane Gonzalez kick); 
STAN – Gaffney 1-yard run (Williamson kick)

2nd quarter scoring:  STAN – Ty Montgomery 22-yard run (Williamson kick); 
STAN – Gaffney 1-yard run (Williamson kick); 
ASU – Foster 65-yard  pass from Taylor Kelly (Gonzalez kick)

3rd quarter scoring: STAN – Williamson 30-yard field goal

4th quarter scoring: STAN – Montgomery 24-yard pass from Kevin Hogan (Williamson kick)

Statistics

See also
 List of Pac-12 Conference football champions

References

External links
 2013 Pac-12 Football Championship Game

Championship
2013
Arizona State Sun Devils football games
Stanford Cardinal football games
Sports in Tempe, Arizona
December 2013 sports events in the United States
Pac-12 Football Championship Game
Sports competitions in Maricopa County, Arizona